The Salvation is a 2014 Danish Western film directed by Kristian Levring and written by Anders Thomas Jensen and Levring. The film stars Mads Mikkelsen, Eva Green, Jeffrey Dean Morgan, Jonathan Pryce, Eric Cantona, Mikael Persbrandt, Douglas Henshall and Michael Raymond-James.

Plot
Following the Second Schleswig War of 1864, Jon and his brother Peter emigrate to the United States from Denmark and settle somewhere between the Mississippi River and the Rocky Mountains. Seven years later, in 1871, Jon's wife, Marie and his 10-year-old son, Kresten, arrive. After they all meet, Jon and his family board a stagecoach bound for their small residence while Peter stays behind. Their coach is also boarded by recently released criminals, Paul and Lester. Following a tense struggle, the criminals throw Jon out of the moving coach after which they rape and kill Jon's wife. They also kill his son and the stagecoach driver and guard.

With great effort, Jon catches up to the coach to find his family murdered. Enraged, he kills the two convicts. Unbeknownst to Jon, Paul is the brother of Henry Delarue, a notorious gang leader and land baron. Upon hearing the news, Delarue kills three innocent citizens of Black Creek, the town that reports the deaths to him. He also forces the townspeople to cooperate and find his brother's killer. Delarue was once an army colonel who fought Native Americans. At one point, he is stated to have once been a good man before he became twisted by war.

After burying his wife and son, Jon decides to leave the town with Peter and sells his land to Keane, Black Creek's mayor and undertaker. Before they can leave, Jon and Peter are captured by the town sheriff and minister, Mallick. As Jon sits in his cell, Mallick tells him that his death will buy the town more time while he tries to inform higher authorities of Delarue's actions. Meanwhile, it is revealed that Delarue is working with the Standard Atlantic Oil Company and, with the help of Mayor Keane, had been acquiring Black Creek and its surrounding land, which is rich with untapped crude oil. Unknown to Mallick, the company managed to intercept his message for help and prevent it from reaching the authorities. Delarue's now widowed sister-in-law Madelaine, who is mute, acts as his accountant and suffers sexual and physical abuse from him.

The next morning, Jon is escorted to Delarue's base, an abandoned town, and is tied to a post and left in the sun. In Black Creek, Peter breaks out of jail and kills several of Delarue's henchmen. He cuts Jon free, and the pair ride off while being pursued by Delarue and his remaining men. Realizing Jon is too weak to carry on, Peter conceals him and leads the gang away, and is eventually caught and killed. Taking advantage of Delarue's absence, Madelaine steals his cash and boards a train. However, the train is intercepted, and she is captured. Delarue tells his men to kill Madelaine after they are done raping her.

Jon roams the countryside, looking for water and shelter. He stumbles across a small residence belonging to Mrs. Whistler, whose husband was killed by Delarue. Jon takes shelter in her house to recover from his wounds while Mrs. Whistler and her children flee. After returning to town, he confronts and kills Mayor Keane for his deception. At the general store, he arms himself and reluctantly accepts the help of Voichek, the young storekeeper whose grandmother was killed by Delarue.

Jon uses diversions and guerrilla tactics to kill Delarue's henchmen one at a time. Voichek is killed and inadvertently sets fire to the hotel where Madelaine is being held, enabling her to escape. Delarue finds and wounds Jon. Just as he is about to kill Jon, Madelaine shoots Delarue twice, and Jon finishes him with a shot to the head. Sheriff Mallick and his deputies arrive at the scene and thank Jon. When they try to arrest Madelaine, Jon orders them to leave and states that he will be taking her with him. The pair leave together, and the film then reveals that the land is ultimately taken over by the oil company.

Cast

 Mads Mikkelsen as Jon, the Danish settler and the heart of the story
 Eva Green as Madelaine, Delarue's mute, widowed sister-in-law
 Jeffrey Dean Morgan as Delarue, a former Yankee Colonel in the civil war, and native American killer and now the gang leader and land baron.
 Eric Cantona as The Corsican, Delarue's enforcer
 Mikael Persbrandt as Peter, Jon's brother
 Douglas Henshall as Sheriff Mallick
 Michael Raymond-James as Paul
 Jonathan Pryce as Mayor Keane
 Alex Arnold as Voichek
 Nanna Øland Fabricius as Marie, Jon's wife
 Toke Lars Bjarke as Kresten, Jon and Marie's son
 Sean Cameron Michael as Lester
 Carl Nel as Stagecoach Whip
 Sivan Raphaely as Mrs. Delgado
 Grant Swanby as Joe No Legs
 Robert Hobbs as Silvertooth
 Adam Neill as Mr. Bradley
 Langley Kirkwood as Man with Beard

Production
Principal photography began on 8 April 2013 in Johannesburg, South Africa.

Reception
On review aggregator website Rotten Tomatoes, The Salvation has a rating of 72% rating based on 78 reviews, with an average rating of 6.4/10. The site's critical consensus reads, "It's all but impossible to add anything new or fresh to the traditional Western, but – thanks in no small part to Mads Mikkelsen's performance – The Salvation comes close." On Metacritic the film has a score of 64 out of a 100 based on 19 critics, signifying "generally favorable reviews".

In The Observer, Jonathan Romney found that the film "tips its Stetson to John Ford and Sergio Leone with bold widescreen visuals – daytime shots in which even the sun looks sunbaked, prairie nightscapes resembling ink-soaked denim", but added "it never transcends reverent pastiche, down to the hackneyed sounds of Morricone-style guitars". Romney concluded, "Best reason to see The Salvation: its chief varmint, played with ornery glint and bristling whiskers by Jeffrey Dean Morgan, who has the sleepy-eyed malignity of vintage western heavy Jack Elam".

References

External links
 
 
 

2014 films
2014 Western (genre) films
Danish drama films
British Western (genre) films
2010s English-language films
English-language Danish films
English-language South African films
2010s Danish-language films
Films directed by Kristian Levring
Films with screenplays by Anders Thomas Jensen
Films shot in Gauteng
Warner Bros. films
South African drama films
2014 drama films
Danish Western (genre) films
South African Western (genre) films
British multilingual films
Danish multilingual films
South African multilingual films
2010s British films
Foreign films set in the United States